The British Art Journal is a triannual journal/magazine that publishes research on British art from all historical periods.

History
The publication was launched on 1 July 1999 at a reception held at the Thomas Coram Foundation (which became the Foundling Museum) in London. Two issues were published in the initial year. Since then, three issues have been published each year.

The editor is the British art historian and critic, Robin Simon.
The journal is accessible online through JSTOR.

See also
 The Art Journal

References

External links
 

1999 establishments in the United Kingdom
Publications established in 1999
Art history journals
Triannual journals
Triannual magazines published in the United Kingdom
Visual arts magazines published in the United Kingdom
British art